Nassahegon State Forest is a Connecticut state forest occupying  in the town of Burlington.The forest is managed for forestry and recreational purposes and is operated by the Connecticut Department of Energy and Environmental Protection.

Features and activities
The state's Burlington Trout Hatchery is located on Belden Road. Opened in 1923, the hatchery raises brown trout and rainbow trout that are distributed into state lakes, ponds, rivers and streams with public access. The facility includes a building for egg incubation, fish pools and ponds, and a short nature trail. The hatchery is open free to the public on a daily basis.

The forest is crossed by the Blue-Blazed Trails system and offers opportunities for hunting, hiking, and mountain biking on approved mountain biking trails.

References

External links
Nassahegon State Forest - Connecticut Department of Energy and Environmental Protection
Burlington Trout Hatchery - Connecticut Department of Energy and Environmental Protection

Connecticut state forests
Parks in Hartford County, Connecticut
Burlington, Connecticut
1926 establishments in Connecticut
Protected areas established in 1926